Skiptrace is a 2016 Hong Kong-Chinese-American buddy cop action comedy film directed by Renny Harlin, produced, starring and based on a story by Jackie Chan. The film co-stars Johnny Knoxville and Fan Bingbing. It was released in China on July 21, 2016 and in the United States on September 2, 2016.

Plot 
in  Hong Kong 2007 detective Bennie Chan (Jackie Chan) has been tracking notorious crime boss "Matador" – whom he believes to be businessman Victor Wong (Winston Chao). While tracking him, Chan's partner Yung (Eric Tsang) is captured. Yung  sacrifices himself and gives his watch to Chan to remember him by. 9 years later Yung's daughter Samantha (Fan Bingbing) gets into trouble with Wong's crime syndicate, Chan must track down an American conman, Connor Watts (Johnny Knoxville), who gambles his way through Chinese casinos after being banned in America and who witnessed the murder of a woman named Esther Yee in Wong's Macau casino. However, before Chan can find him, Connor is kidnapped by the men of a Russian kingpin to answer for getting his daughter pregnant.

After intercepting several Russians, Chan rescues Connor. Chan races against the clock to bring Connor back from Russia to Hong Kong. However, Connor steals Chan's passport and burns it, forcing the pair to travel on foot to Inner Mongolia. In Mongolia, Chan helps an injured Mongolian boy and then they stumble onto a Mongolian village's wrestling match. Chan is unable to defeat the Mongolian wrestler until the injured boy intervenes which stops the match. The villagers hold a celebration for Chan and Connor for their help in which Chan speaks of his motivation and reasons for what he is doing. Connor subsequently reveals that before she died Esther gave a phone to him which belongs to the "Matador". While crossing into China, Connor make a fuss leading to both of them being arrested by the police for various offenses as Connor would rather be imprisoned than being killed by "Matador" and his gang. They are broken out of police custody by a Siberian hitwoman and her gang, who wish to capture Connor and bring him back to the Russian kingpin but they manage to escape her pursuit.

Connor sees Wong on the news and recognizes him as Esther's murderer. Chan learns that Samantha is already taken by Wong's right-hand man Willie and his men, who threaten to kill her if Chan refuses to bring the phone back to Hong Kong. Connor parts ways with Chan, giving him the phone which will implicate Wong as the "Matador". While attempting to prove Wong as the "Matador", Wong's thumbprint does not matches the phone's security thumbprint and Chan is arrested by the Hong Kong police instead. Connor helps to break out Chan and with the assistance of Leslie, Chan's co-worker, bypasses the phone's security and finds a clue to the "Matador" identity.

Leslie informs Chan that their police captain, Tang (Michael Wong), is now working with Wong and helps Chan and Connor leave the police station. Chan and Conner sneak to the shipyard where Matador's criminal organization is located. They witness Wong talking to "Matador" and Wong is then killed for his failure to bring back the phone. Attempting to rescue Samantha, the two are eventually held captive by the criminal gang. "Matador" reveals himself to Chan as the supposedly deceased Yung. Yung confesses to Chan about faking his death and then reunites with his daughter Samantha. Yung leaves Samantha locked up in a room after she expresses her disappointment and anger on his fake death and his criminal activities. After a boat hits the cargo ship, the ship starts to slowly flood and sinks. The Siberian hitwoman arrives with help to rescue Chan and Connor with police arriving eventually also. Chan and Yung work together to save Samantha from drowning inside the cargo ship with Yung committing suicide by drowning himself. The authorities then arrest Tang and Willie.

Connor goes back to Russia, fulfilling his honor, to witness the birth of his child with the kingpin's daughter. After the baby is born, it was evident that the baby is not his and Connor leaves the hospital. Later, Connor and Samantha surprise Chan back at his farm, providing him with alpacas to help fulfill his earlier-confessed lifelong dream of running an alpaca farm. Connor leaves with Samantha after attempting to knock out Chan via a technique taught by Chan himself. Chan is successfully knocked out after attempting to stay awake until Connor is out of sight.

Cast
 Jackie Chan as Bennie Chan / Benny Black
 Johnny Knoxville as Connor Watts
 Fan Bingbing as Samantha Bai
 Eric Tsang as Yung Bai
 Eve Torres as Dasha
 Winston Chao as Victor Wong
 Yeon Jung-hoon as Handsome Willie 
 Shi Shi as Leslie
 Michael Wong as Captain Tang
 Dylan Kuo as Esmond
 Zhang Lanxin as Ting Ting
 Na Wei as Office Wu
 Sara Forsberg as Natalya
 Mikhail Gorevoy as Dima, Russian Kingpin
 Charles Rawes as Sergei
 Jai Day as Vladmir
 Richard Ng as Elderly man on bus
 Sabrina Qiu as Esther Yee
 Chris Verrill as Tourist Eugene

Production
The film was first announced in May 2013 as Sino-American co-production to be directed by Sam Fell and starring Jackie Chan and Fan Bingbing with Chan playing a Hong Kong detective who allies with a gambling conman to find a criminal mastermind. Exclusive Media is the agent for the international sales rights. On 22 October 2013, it was announced that actor Seann William Scott has been added to the cast as the previously uncast gambler. On September 3, 2014, Johnny Knoxville replaced Scott for the co-starring role.

Production was due to begin on January 13, 2014 and will be filmed in Hong Kong and China. Filming began on September 3, 2014, in China, and was due to end on December 15, 2014.

On December 17, 2014, cinematographer Chan Kwok-hung drowned while on a shoot for the film.

Reception
The film was number-one on its opening in China, grossing .

Critical response
, the film holds an approval rating of 38% on Rotten Tomatoes, based on 32 with an average rating of 4.53/10. On Metacritic the film has a weighted average score of 50% based on reviews from 9 critics.

Dennis Harvey of Variety magazine wrote: "Skiptrace remains lively, diverting, and essentially good-natured even when it's cheerfully dumb, exploiting its diverse locations for every last drop of local color." Neil Genzlinger of The New York Times gave a negative review and wrote: "Skiptrace settles for a warmed-over plot, tedious fight sequences and humor that's heavy on crotch jokes and pratfalls."

References

External links
 
 
 Skiptrace Press Conference Jackie Chan site 25. May 2016

2016 films
2016 action comedy films
2016 multilingual films
2010s buddy cop films
2010s English-language films
American multilingual films
American action comedy films
American buddy comedy films
American buddy cop films
Chinese action comedy films
Chinese multilingual films
English-language Chinese films
English-language Hong Kong films
Films directed by Renny Harlin
Films set in Hong Kong
Films set in Macau
Films set in Mongolia
Films set in Siberia
Films shot in China
Films shot in Hong Kong
Hong Kong action comedy films
Hong Kong buddy films
Martial arts comedy films
Saban Entertainment films
2010s Mandarin-language films
2010s American films
2010s Hong Kong films